Amaranthus thunbergii, commonly known as Thunberg's amaranthus or Thunberg's pigweed, is found in Africa.

The leaves are used as a flavouring or leafy vegetable.

References

External links
 PROTAbase on Amaranthus thunbergii
 

thunbergii
African cuisine
Leaf vegetables